Gerald Friedman SC (born 13 September 1928) is a South African retired judge and former Judge President of the Cape Provincial Division of the Supreme Court.

Early life and education 
Friedman studied at the University of Cape Town and obtained the degrees of BA and LLB.

Career
In 1950, Friedman was admitted to the Cape Bar and twenty year later, in 1970 he took silk. In 1977, he was appointed a judge at the Cape Provincial Division of the Supreme Court and in 1990, he was promoted to Judge of Appeal. In 1992 re-joined the Cape Division of the Supreme Court, becoming the Judge President of the Cape, a post he had held until 1998.

From 1999 until 2010, Friedman acted as the chairperson of the Financial Services Appeal Board and from 1999 until 2007, also as chair of the Ombudsman's Council.

Notable cases
Friedman was the presiding judge in the murder trial of the accused for the murder of the American student, Amy Biehl, during 1993. He convicted the accused and sentenced them to 18 years in prison.

References

1928 births
Living people
South African judges
20th-century South African judges
University of Cape Town alumni